The 120 members of the eleventh Knesset were elected on 23 July 1984. The breakdown by party was as follows:
Alignment: 44
Likud: 41
Tehiya: 5
National Religious Party: 4
Hadash: 4
Shas: 4
Shinui: 3
Ratz: 3
Yahad: 3
Progressive List for Peace: 2
Agudat Yisrael: 2
Morasha: 2
Tami: 1
Kach: 1
Ometz: 1

List of members

Replacements

External links
Members of the Eleventh Knesset Knesset website

 
11